Ebenezer is a town in Saint Mary Parish, Antigua and Barbuda.

It is located next to the city of Jennings.

Demographics 
Ebenezer has two enumeration districts.

 82300 EbenezerHall
 82400 Ebenezer-GreenHill

2011 Census Data

References 

Saint Mary Parish, Antigua and Barbuda
Populated places in Antigua and Barbuda